Metro Radio is an Independent Local Radio station based in Newcastle upon Tyne, England, owned and operated by Bauer as part of the Hits Radio network. It broadcasts to County Durham, Northumberland and Tyne and Wear.

As of December 2022, the station has a weekly audience of 330,000 listeners according to RAJAR.

History

Launch
The Newcastle-based station, broadcasting to north-east England, launched on 15 July 1974. The first breakfast show was presented by Don Dwyer, an Australian radio presenter formerly at ABC and the United Biscuits Network. The first show included messages of congratulations from Kenny Everett at the equivalent local commercial station in London, Capital Radio.

Studios

The station transmitted from a studio in Swalwell, Gateshead, which in later years would be adjacent to the Metrocentre and is now Metropolitan House—a business centre providing serviced office accommodation. Metro, and sister station Magic 1152, moved in 2005 to the former BT building previously known as Swan Housenow known as 55° Northnext to the Tyne Bridge in Newcastle upon Tyne. In April 2021, it was announced that Metro Radio were relocating their studios once more. Later in 2021 as planned, they relocated their broadcasting studios to the Grade II listed building, Gainsborough House on Newcastle's Grey Street. Before the move, the studio had undergone a purposed fit-out which included 2 additional studios and a contemporary, flexible office space.

Football commentary
Until 2005 the station broadcast live football commentary for the region's two biggest clubs – Newcastle United and Sunderland. In an attempt to boost ratings, the football commentary was stopped. However, a negative response from football fans prompted the owners to cover all Newcastle and Sunderland games on sister station Magic 1152.

TFM co-location
From 8 April 2013, all Metro Radio's programming has been shared with TFM. However, the Metro Radio branding was retained along with separate advertising and local news bulletins. The two stations were able to co-locate without consultation, for the Metro Radio licence area is located in one approved broadcast area (north-east England).

Programming
Networked programming originates from Bauer's Manchester headquarters.

Regional programming is produced and broadcast from Bauer's Newcastle studios, weekdays 6-10am (Steve & Karen's Breakfast Show) and is syndicated with sister station TFM.

The station's long-running talk show Night Owls, presented by Alan Robson since 1983, ran for over 40 years before airing its final edition in June 2019. It then aired weekly on GHR North East and GHR Teesside until 24 April 2022, after which Robson moved into making material for online distribution only.

News
Bauer's Newcastle newsroom broadcasts local news bulletins hourly from 6am-7pm on weekdays, and from 7am-1pm on Saturdays and Sundays. Headlines are broadcast on the half-hour during weekday breakfast and drivetime shows, alongside traffic bulletins.

National bulletins from Sky News Radio are carried overnight with bespoke networked bulletins on weekend afternoons, usually originating from Bauer's Leeds newsroom.

Notable former presenters

 Rich Clarke (Heart South)
 Mark Goodier (Greatest Hits Radio)
 Pete Graves (Sky Sports News)
 Lucy Horobin (Heart Dance)
 Dave Kelly (Radio City)
 Jason King (Heart London)
 Gabby Logan
 Jonathan Morrell (BBC Radio Newcastle)
 Jenny Powell (Greatest Hits Radio)
 Alan Robson (Greatest Hits Radio)
 Joel Ross (Rock FM)
Lisa Shaw (deceased) 
 Bill Steel
 Pip Tomson (Good Morning Britain)
 Clive Warren
 James Whale (talkRADIO)
 Russ Williams (Nation Radio UK)
 Ingrid Hagemann

Awards and nominations

Sony Radio Academy Awards

References

External links
 
 
 Metro Radio - Cash for Kids

Bauer Radio
Hits Radio
Radio stations in North East England
Radio stations established in 1974
1974 establishments in England